Kevin Ochieng Opondo (born 5 October 1985) is a Kenyan former footballer who played as a midfielder.

Career
Born in Kajiado, Ochieng played club football for Mathare United, Al-Shabab SC (Seeb), Sofapaka, Gor Mahia, Posta Rangers and Nairobi City Stars.

He earned 25 caps for the Kenyan national team, scoring twice.

References

1985 births
Living people
Kenyan footballers
Kenya international footballers
Mathare United F.C. players
Al-Shabab SC (Seeb) players
Sofapaka F.C. players
Gor Mahia F.C. players
Posta Rangers F.C. players
Nairobi City Stars players
Association football midfielders
Kenyan expatriate footballers
Kenyan expatriates in Oman
Expatriate footballers in Oman